Ghosh (or Ghose) is an Indian and Bangladeshi surname found among Bengali Hindus.

Ghoshes mostly belong to Kayastha caste in Bengal. The Bengali Kayasthas evolved as a caste from a category of officials or scribes, between the 5th/6th century AD and 11th/12th century AD, its component elements being putative Kshatriyas and mostly Brahmins. Ghoshes are considered as Kulin Kayasthas of Soukalin gotra, along with Boses, Guhas and Mitras.

Ghosh is also used as surname by the Sadgop and Goala/Gowala (caste) in Bengal.

Notable people

 Girish Chandra Ghosh (born 1844) Bengali actor, director, and writer.
 Sri Aurobindo (born as Aurobindo Ghose in 1872), Indian philosopher.
 Barindra Kumar Ghosh (1880–1959), Indian revolutionary and journalist
 Amitav Ghosh (born 1956), Indian writer
 Amitav Ghosh (banker), Indian banker
 Anindita Ghosh, British historian
 Anirvan Ghosh (born 1964), American neuroscientist
 Aparna Ghosh, Bangladeshi actress and model 
 DJ Talent, birth name Anthony Ghosh (born 1978), British reality television contestant
 Atulkrishna Ghosh (1890–1966), Indian revolutionary
 Atulya Ghosh (1904–1986), Indian politician
 Debaprasad Ghosh (1894–1985), Indian politician
 Debendra Nath Ghosh (1890–1999), Bangladeshi politician
 Dhiman Ghosh (born 1987), Bangladeshi cricketer
 Dilip Ghosh, Indian politician
 Dilip Ghosh (economist), American economist
 Dipu Ghosh, Indian badminton player
 Ganesh Ghosh (1900–1994), Bengali Indian independence activist, revolutionary and politician
Helen Ghosh (born 1956), British civil servant
 Jayanta Kumar Ghosh (born 1937), Indian statistician
 Jayati Ghosh (born 1955), Indian economist
 Joseph Ghosh (1869–1942), Indian educationist
 Malay Ghosh (born 1944), Indian statistician
 Opashona Ghosh, Indian illustrator and graphic designer
 Paramahansa Yogananda, born Mukunda Lal Ghosh (1893–1952), Indian yogi and guru 
 Pallab Ghosh (born 1962), Indian journalist
 Prafulla Chandra Ghosh (1891–1983), first Chief Minister of West Bengal, India
 Reshmi Ghosh,  Indian beauty queen and actress
 Rabi Ghosh (1931–1997), Indian actor
 Ranjan Ghosh (academic), Indian academic and teacher
 Rishab Aiyer Ghosh (born 1975), Dutch journalist, computer scientist and open-source software advocate
 Rituparno Ghosh (1963–2013), Indian film director
 Robin Ghosh (1929–2016), Bangladeshi musician and music composer
 Sangita Ghosh (born 1976), Indian actress
 Sarat Kumar Ghosh (1878–1962), Indian civil servant and jurist
 Shankha Ghosh (1932–2021), Indian poet
 Shankar Ghosh (1935–2016), Indian tabla player
 Sisir Kumar Ghosh (1840–1911), Indian journalist
 Sujoy Ghosh, Indian film director, actor and screenwriter
 Shreela Ghosh (born 1962), Indian arts executive and actor
 Shibdas Ghosh (1923–1976), Indian politician
 Shiulie Ghosh (born 1968), British journalist
 Subodh Ghosh (1909–1980), Indian author and journalist
 Subroto Ghosh, Indian cricketer
 Taposh Ghosh (born 1991), Bangladeshi cricketer

See also
 R v Ghosh, an English criminal law case

References

Surnames
Bengali Hindu surnames
Indian surnames
Kayastha